Microsargus is a genus of flies in the family Stratiomyidae.

Species
Microsargus stuckenbergi Lindner, 1958

References

Stratiomyidae
Brachycera genera
Taxa named by Erwin Lindner
Diptera of Africa
Monotypic Brachycera genera